Terence Allcock (born 10 December 1935) is a former professional footballer who played for Bolton Wanderers and Norwich City. He was also a first-class cricketer.

Bolton Wanderers
Allcock was born in Leeds and began his football career with Bolton Wanderers, who approached him while he was captain of Yorkshire schoolboys. When interviewed in 2004 for the book Twelve Canary Greats, Allcock stated that his decision to sign for Bolton was made when his father's job moved to Blackpool and Bolton permitted him to commute from there. He made his first team debut in October 1953 against Manchester City and scored twice in the first twenty minutes. Despite his good start, Allcock was unable to secure a regular first team spot at Burnden Park because he was competing against internationals Nat Lofthouse, Willie Moir and Harold Hassall for a place in the side. He signed for Norwich shortly before the transfer deadline in March 1958.

Norwich City
In his first full season at Carrow Road, Norwich had one of the most famous FA Cup runs of all time when they reached the semi-finals as a Third Division side. Allcock scored against Tottenham Hotspur in the tie at White Hart Lane. He went on to play 389 games for Norwich, with his final appearance coming against Blackburn Rovers at Carrow Road on 23 April 1969. His 127 goals for the club place him second on City's all time goalscoring list, just five goals behind Johnny Gavin. Allcock spent most of his career as a forward, but his last five seasons with Norwich were spent playing at half-back. If he had continued to play as a forward, he would almost certainly have beaten Gavin's record. Allcock also has the record of scoring 37 goals in a calendar season, the highest achieved in any calendar season by a Norwich City player.

Cricket
Allcock also played cricket as a wicket-keeper for Norfolk, appearing for the county in the Minor Counties Championship from 1959 to 1975. His appearances were infrequent, with him playing a total of 36 matches in the competition for Norfolk. He made his List A debut in the 1965 Gillette Cup against Hampshire. In this match Allcock caught-behind Hampshire captain Colin Ingleby-Mackenzie, while with the bat he made 21 runs before being dismissed by Butch White. He made a further List A appearance in the 1968 Gillette Cup against Cheshire. He scored four runs in the match before being dismissed by Gerry Hardstaff.

After playing
Allcock stayed at Norwich as a coach until 1973 before a brief coaching stint at Manchester City. He is now a matchday host at Carrow Road and in 2002 was made an inaugural member of the Norwich City F.C. Hall of Fame. Allcock currently is a partner in the family funeral business.

Sources

Canary Citizens by Mark Davage, John Eastwood, Kevin Platt, published by Jarrold Publishing, (2001), 
12 Canary Greats by Rick Waghorn, published by Jarrold Publishing (2004), 

1935 births
Living people
English footballers
Bolton Wanderers F.C. players
Norwich City F.C. players
English cricketers
Norfolk cricketers
English Football League players
Footballers from Leeds
Association football forwards
Cricketers from Leeds
Wicket-keepers